Valle Edén is a hamlet in the valley of the same name in Tacuarembó Department, Uruguay.

Location

Landmarks
The hamlet includes a train station, a police station, a school (Escuela 23) and a museum, the Museo Carlos Gardel dedicated to Carlos Gardel, the famous tango singer, songwriter and actor. Uruguayans claim that Gardel was born here. Scholarly consensus is that Gardel was born in Toulouse, France.

References

Populated places in the Tacuarembó Department